Víctor Javier Rivero Faccioli (born 15 March 1980) is a Chilean football manager and former player who played as a goalkeeper, currently in charge of Deportes Limache in the Segunda División Profesional de Chile.

Career
As a youth player, Rivero was with Santiago Wanderers. At senior level, he played for Municipal Limache, San Luis de Quillota and Unión La Calera.

After three seasons as assistant coach and leading San Luis de Quillota, Everton de Viña del Mar and Rangers de Talca, he had a successful stint with Unión La Calera in 2017 winnign the 2017 Transición of the Primera B.

In 2023, he signed with Deportes Limache in the Segunda División Profesional de Chile.

Honors

Club

As Manager
San Luis de Quillota
 Primera B de Chile (1): 2014–15

Unión La Calera
 Primera B de Chile (1): 2017

References

External links
 
 

1980 births
Living people
Sportspeople from Valparaíso
Chilean footballers
Municipal Limache footballers
San Luis de Quillota footballers
Unión La Calera footballers
Primera B de Chile players
Association football goalkeepers
Chilean football managers
San Luis de Quillota managers
Everton de Viña del Mar managers
Rangers de Talca managers
Unión La Calera managers
Cobreloa managers
Santiago Wanderers managers
Unión San Felipe managers
Deportes Iquique managers
Deportes Limache managers
Primera B de Chile managers
Chilean Primera División managers
Segunda División Profesional de Chile managers